Coming Soon!!! is a novel by American writer John Barth, published in 2001.

The competing protagonists of the metafictional work are the Novelist Emeritus, who is a recent retired novelist from Johns Hopkins University; and the Novelist Aspirant, Johns Hopkins Johnson.  The Novelist Emeritus plans to reorchestrate his first novel The Floating Opera as The Original Floating Opera II, and the Novelist Aspirant challenges him by attempting to reinvent that novel himself in hypertext.

References

Works cited

 
 

2001 American novels
Novels by John Barth
Novels set in Maryland
Houghton Mifflin books
Metafictional novels